Holes or Holeš (Slovak/Czech feminine: Holešová) is a surname. Notable people include:

 Július Holeš (born 1939), Slovak footballer
 Mária Holešová (born 1993), Slovak handballer
 Paul Holes (born 1968), American investigator
 Tomáš Holeš (born 1993), Czech footballer

See also
 

Czech-language surnames
Slovak-language surnames